Fritz Schallwig (1890-1960) was a champion German cyclist.

Biography
He was born on May 7, 1890, in Spandau in Berlin, Germany.

He won his first race in 1910 in Germany in the Berlin to Leipzig race.

During World War I he was awarded the Iron Cross.

In 1921 he won the Nuremberg to Munich race.

External links
Fritz Schallwig at the Cycling Archives
Fritz Schallwig at Sports.org

References

1890 births
Recipients of the Iron Cross (1914)
German male cyclists
People from Spandau
Cyclists from Berlin
1960 deaths